Hojjatollah Abdolmaleki (born 1981 in Shahr-e-Rey, Iran) is the Secretary of the Supreme Council of Free Trade-Industrial and Special Economic Zones. He has been the deputy for employment and self-sufficiency in Imam Khomeini Relief Foundation and was the Minister of Labor, Cooperation, and Social Welfare of Iran.

References

External links
Official website

1981 births
Living people
Government ministers of Iran